Annia Rivera (born 13 August 1991) is a Cuban diver. She competed in the 10 metre platform event at the 2012 Summer Olympics.

References

1991 births
Living people
Cuban female divers
Divers at the 2012 Summer Olympics
Olympic divers of Cuba
Divers at the 2011 Pan American Games
Pan American Games bronze medalists for Cuba
Pan American Games medalists in diving
Medalists at the 2011 Pan American Games